The 2018–19 season was the 53rd season of AZ Alkmaar and the club's 21st consecutive season in the top flight of Dutch football. In addition to the domestic league, AZ Alkmaar participated in the KNVB Cup and the UEFA Europa League. The season covered the period from 1 July 2018 to 30 June 2019.

Players

First-team squad

For recent transfers, see List of Dutch football transfers winter 2017–18

Out on loan

Competitions

Overview

Eredivisie

League table

Results summary

Results by round

Matches

KNVB Cup

UEFA Europa League

Qualifying rounds

References

External links

AZ Alkmaar seasons
AZ Alkmaar
AZ Alkmaar